Villager Football Club was established on 2 June 1876 and so claims to be the second oldest rugby club in Cape Town, South Africa. Villager FC were scheduled to play against Stellenbosch Rugby Football Club in the first official match at Newlands Stadium after it opened on 31 May 1890. Many notable South African rugby players began their careers at the club, including Paddy Carolin, vice-captain on the 1906 Springbok tour to Europe, and former 800m track world record holder Marcello Fiasconaro.

Name 
The club's name derives from the number of villages that spread west from Cape Town towards Simonstown during the colonial period, which later became suburbs of the city. Rugby's rules of football were only adopted by Villagers in 1879, who played according to Winchester's rules until then.

Notable members 
Villagers have produced the second most Springboks (58) of all South African rugby clubs, second only to Stellenbosch (Maties). The first Villager to represent  was H.H Castens. Other prominent Villager Springboks include HO de Villiers (14 tests), Morné du Plessis (22), and Joel Stransky (22). In addition Villager FC produced 175 Western Province players.  

Other prominent players include:  

 Fairy Heatlie - Springbok (1891-1903); 5th Springbok captain (1896); caused  Springboks to wear green jerseys; represented Argentina (1910)  
 Doug Hopwood - first modern No. 8 
 William Henry Milton - represented  (1874–75); South African cricketer (1988–92); Administrator of Southern Rhodesia (1901–14) 
 Frank Mellish - represented  (1920–21; Springbok (1921–24); manager (1951 tour to Britain & France)
 Stephen Fry - Springbok (1951–55) & captain (1955) 
 Paul Johnstone - Springbok (1951–56); captain, Oxford RFC (1954) 
 Christian Stewart - represented   (1991–95) & South Africa (1998) 
 Percy Montgomery - Springbok (1997-2008); 3rd most caps as Springbok (102) 
 Nick Easter - represented England (2007–15); 54 caps including 3 World Cups

Club honours 
Since 1925 Villager FC have won either the Grand Challenge Cup or Western Province Super League A title 13 times.

The following refers to competitions that the club won between 1925 and 2001:

In 2017 the club was promoted to the Super League A. Struggling in the A league the club got demoted in 2015 and after a rebuilding process has been promoted once again to Super League A in 2017.

See also 
 Villager FC players

References

External links 
 

Rugby clubs established in 1876
Sport in Cape Town
South African rugby union teams
1876 establishments in the Cape Colony